Yekaterina Kharchenko (born August 11, 1977, Kursk) is a Russian political figure and deputy of the 8th State Duma. In 2021, she was granted a Doctor of Sciences in Economics degree

She started her career at the Kursk Politechnical Institute as a graduate student, docent, and, later, a senior lecturer. She was also a dean of the Faculty of Economics and Management. From 2016 to 2019, she headed the Committee on Education and Science of the Kursk region. In 2019, she was appointed Deputy Governor of the Kursk region on internal affairs. In 2020–2021, she headed the Kursk State Agricultural Academy. She left the post in September 2021 to become a deputy of the 8th State Duma.

References

1977 births
Living people
United Russia politicians
21st-century Russian politicians
Eighth convocation members of the State Duma (Russian Federation)
21st-century Russian women politicians
Politicians from Kursk